Subsidiaries of Toshiba. Together, these companies form the Toshiba Group.

Subsidiaries 
As of April 2020, Toshiba is organized into six groupings as follows:
Electronic Devices & Storage Solutions
Toshiba Electronic Devices & Storage Corporation
Semiconductor Division
Storage Products Division (HDD)
Research & Develop Center
Building Solutions
Toshiba Elevator & Building Systems Corporation
Toshiba Lighting & Technology Corporation
Energy Systems & Solutions
Toshiba Plant Systems & Services Corporation (combined-cycle gas power plants, nuclear power plants, hydro-electric power plants, and associated components)
Toshiba Energy Systems & Solutions Corporation (energy-related solutions, including energy transmission and distribution, heavy ion therapy solutions)
Infrastructure Systems & Solutions
Toshiba Infrastructure Systems & Solutions Corporation
Railway & Automotive Systems Division
Railway Systems Division
Automotive Systems Division
Motor & Drive Systems Division
Automation Products & Facility Solution Division
Defense & Electronic Systems Division
Environmental Systems Division
Digital Solutions
Toshiba Digital Solutions Corporation

Retail & Printing Solutions
Toshiba Tec Corporation (publicly listed; 50 percent stake is owned by Toshiba)
 Toshiba TEC Solution Service Corporation.
 Toshiba TEC Europe Retail Information Systems S.A.
 Toshiba TEC Germany Imaging Systems GmbH
 Toshiba Global Commerce Solutions Holdings Corporation

Affiliates and joint ventures 
 TMEIC (joint venture with Mitsubishi Electric)
 Kioxia (40%)

Former subsidiaries and affiliates 
Toshiba EMI
Westinghouse Electric Company
Landis+Gyr
Toshiba Logistics Corporation
Dynabook Inc.
Toshiba Carrier Corporation

References 

Subs
Toshiba